The maritime striped squirrel or eastern striped squirrel (Tamiops maritimus) is a species of rodent in the family Sciuridae. It is found in southern and eastern China (including Hainan), Taiwan, and Laos and Vietnam east of Mekong. It is diurnal, highly arboreal and feeds on fruits, seeds, insects; in addition its diet includes nectar of ginger (Alpinia kwangsiensis).

References

Tamiops
Mammals described in 1900
Rodents of China
Rodents of Laos
Mammals of Taiwan
Rodents of Vietnam
Taxa named by J. Lewis Bonhote
Taxonomy articles created by Polbot